Uncial 0184 (in the Gregory-Aland numbering), is a Greek-Coptic diglot uncial manuscript of the New Testament, dated paleographically to the 6th century.

Description 

The codex contains a small parts of the Gospel of Mark 15:36-37,40-41, on one parchment leaf (29 cm by 23 cm). It is written in two columns per page, 23 lines per page, in uncial letters.

The Greek text of this codex is a representative of the Alexandrian text-type, with many singular omissions. Aland placed it in Category II.

Currently it is dated by the INTF to the 6th century.

The codex currently is housed at the Papyrus Collection of the Austrian National Library (Pap. K. 8662) in Vienna.

See also 

 List of New Testament uncials
 Coptic versions of the Bible
 Mark 15

References

Further reading 

 
 New Testament Greek Papyri and Parchments, ed. Stanley E. Porter & Wendy J. Porter, Walter de Gruyter: Berlin - New York 2008, s. 115–117.

External links 
  – digitalized manuscript

Greek New Testament uncials
6th-century biblical manuscripts
Greek-Coptic diglot manuscripts of the New Testament
Biblical manuscripts of the Austrian National Library